Peter Flynn (born 11 October 1936) is a Scottish former professional footballer who made 132 appearances in the Football League playing as a wing half or inside forward for Leeds United and Bradford Park Avenue. Flynn was born in Glasgow in 1936 and played for junior club Petershill before moving to England.

References

1936 births
Living people
Footballers from Glasgow
Scottish footballers
Association football wing halves
Leeds United F.C. players
Bradford (Park Avenue) A.F.C. players
English Football League players